The Denmark women's national volleyball team represents Denmark in international women's volleyball competitions and friendly matches.

References

External links
Danish women's national volleyball team on the site of the Danish volleyball federation

National women's volleyball teams
Volleyball
Volleyball in Denmark